StartUp Britain is a national campaign founded by a group of eight British entrepreneurs to encourage enterprise in the UK.

The campaign was launched on 28 March, 2011 by then Prime Minister David Cameron with the support of then Chancellor, George Osborne and the Government; although, it is completely funded by private sector sponsors.

Founding members 

 Duncan Cheatle, The Supper Club
 Emma Jones, Enterprise Nation
 James Murray Wells, Glasses Direct and Hearing Direct
 Lara Morgan, Company Shortcut
 Michael Hayman, Seven Hills
 Oli Barrett, Co-sponsorship Agency
 Rajeeb Dey, Enternships.com
 Richard O’Connor, Chocolate and Love

Operations 

StartUp Britain was acquired in March 2014 by the Centre for Entrepreneurs, part of the New Entrepreneurs Foundation charity. It is run separately from the centre's main activities but partakes in joint reports and research to help shape and inform policy.

The campaign organises an annual summer bus tour which has visited more than 60 British towns and cities. More than 25,000 people have boarded each year to receive advice from representatives of companies including PayPal, BT Business and Intuit.

It runs annual finance, tech, and marketing weeks in which experts in these industries share their experiences and has also held one-day events including StartUp Food, StartUp Fashion and StartUp Entertainment which offered guidance  on succeeding in these sectors.

StartUp Britain has more than 100 "champions" running campaigns at local levels to encourage more people to start their own businesses.

Its Pitch Up initiative has encouraged high street brands such as John Lewis and Sainsbury's to accept pitches from start-up companies while more than 350 small traders have had working experience from vacant shop units through the Pop Up Britain scheme.

References

External links
 Startupbritain.org
 Centreforentrepreneurs.org
 StartUp Britain Facebook
 StartUp Britain Twitter

Business incubators of the United Kingdom
2011 establishments in the United Kingdom
Organizations established in 2011